Tanah Laut Regency is one of the regencies in the Indonesian province of South Kalimantan. The area is 3,631.35 km2, and the population was 296,333 at the 2010 Census and 348,966 at the 2020 Census; the official estimate as at mid 2021 was 354,340. The capital is the town of Pelaihari. Motto: "Tuntung Pandang" (Banjarese). Tuntung Pandang have meaning as "nice to see until forever"

Administrative districts
The Regency is divided into eleven districts (kecamatan), listed below with their areas and their populations at the 2010 Census and 2020 Census, together with the official estimates as at mid 2021. The table includes the location of the district administrative centres, the number of administrative villages (rural desa and urban kelurahan) in each district, and its post code.

Climate
Pelaihari, the seat of the regency has a tropical rainforest climate (Af) with moderate rainfall from July to October and heavy to very heavy rainfall from November to June.

External links

References

 
Regencies of South Kalimantan